Dubrovsky is a 1936 Soviet drama film directed by Aleksandr Ivanovsky.

Plot 
The film is based on the posthumously published 1841 eponymous novel by Alexander Pushkin.

Starring 
 Boris Livanov as Vladimir Dubrovsky
 Nikolay Monakhov as Kirill Petrovich Troekurov
 Galina Grigoreva as Marya Kirilovna Troyekurova
 Vladimir Gardin as Prince Vereysky
 Mikhail Tarkhanov as Spitsin
 Pavel Volkov as Arkhip
 Stepan Kayukov as Colonel
 Konstantin Sorokin as Paramoshka
 Iosif Samarin-Elsky as Dubrovsky's father

References

External links 

1936 films
1930s Russian-language films
Soviet drama films
1936 drama films
Soviet black-and-white films
Films based on works by Aleksandr Pushkin